Almon Rouse Meek (1834 – June 30, 1888), also referred to as Almon R. Meek and A. R. Meek, was an American lawyer and politician who served as the eighth Florida Attorney General.

Early life and education 
Meek was born in Greenfield, Indiana in 1834 to Cornwell and Rowena Meek. In 1857, Meek attended Harvard University, graduating the next year. He moved to Florida in 1868 and was admitted into the Florida Bar on April 9, 1868.

Political career 
Governor Harrison Reed, who, similarly to Meek, was a Midwesterner who came to Florida after the American Civil War, appointed Meek as the eighth Florida Attorney General.

During Meek's tenure, the Florida Senate attempted to impeach Reed twice. As a result of the first impeachment attempt, Lieutenant Governor William Henry Gleeson claimed the title of Governor of Florida. However, Meek, a supporter of Reed, sued Gleeson on behalf of the people of Florida. The trial, Florida v. Gleeson, went to the Florida Supreme Court, where many of the recent appointees were supporters of Reed. Not surprisingly, the Court ruled Gleeson's claim unconstitutional and removed him from office as Lieutenant Governor on December 14, 1868.

Meek resigned as Florida Attorney General in 1870 due to his health. He later served as a U.S. Court Commissioner and as the Chief Supervisor of Elections for the Northern District of Florida.

Personal life 
In 1868, Meek married Eliza R. Rice, a friend he met while at Harvard, though she died the next year. In 1872, he married Phoebe Caroline Piper, another old friend. He had no children with either wife.

Death and burial 
Meek died on June 30, 1888 at his home in Jacksonville, Florida. He is buried in Jacksonville's Evergreen Cemetery.

References

Florida Attorneys General
1834 births
1888 deaths
Harvard Law School alumni
People from Greenfield, Indiana
People from Jacksonville, Florida
19th-century American politicians